Scipio is a town on the eastern edge of Millard County, Utah, United States. The population was 290 at the 2000 census.

Geography

About halfway between Scipio and Salina is Lake Scipio, on the west side of US‑50. To the south are the Pahvant Mountains, which rise above .

Climate

According to the Köppen Climate Classification system, Scipio has a hot-summer humid continental climate, abbreviated "Dfa" on climate maps.

Demographics

As of the census of 2000, there were 290 people, 112 households, and 91 families residing in the town. The population density was 340.8 people per square mile (131.7/km2). There were 139 housing units at an average density of 163.4 per square mile (63.1/km2). The racial makeup of the town was 97.59% White, 0.34% Native American, 0.69% from other races, and 1.38% from two or more races. Hispanic or Latino of any race were 3.79% of the population.

There were 112 households, out of which 28.6% had children under the age of 18 living with them, 72.3% were married couples living together, 6.3% had a female householder with no husband present, and 18.8% were non-families. 18.8% of all households were made up of individuals, and 13.4% had someone living alone who was 65 years of age or older. The average household size was 2.59 and the average family size was 2.95.

In the town, the population was spread out, with 24.8% under the age of 18, 8.6% from 18 to 24, 14.8% from 25 to 44, 24.5% from 45 to 64, and 27.2% who were 65 years of age or older. The median age was 46 years. For every 100 females, there were 105.7 males. For every 100 females age 18 and over, there were 105.7 males.

The median income for a household in the town was $30,227, and the median income for a family was $35,625. Males had a median income of $30,714 versus $13,750 for females. The per capita income for the town was $14,003. None of the families and 1.7% of the population were living below the poverty line, including no under eighteens and 1.3% of those over 64.

History 

Scipio was settled in 1859. Early names included Round Valley and Craball, but it was eventually named for Scipio Africanus Kenner, a young lawyer who helped the pioneers to obtain legal title to the land.
In 1861, George A. Smith organized a branch of The Church of Jesus Christ of Latter-day Saints in the town. A Fort Scipio also existed here at one time.

There are several pioneer-style homes in the town.  Several houses are found on the National Register of Historic Places. They include the Peter Quarnberg House, the Merien and Rosabelle Robins House, the Thuesen-Petersen House and the Pharo Village (a Fremont site) south of Scipio. Also on the Historic Register is the Town Hall built in 1935 which includes a museum for the family, D.U.P. and a Senior Citizens Center. The Scipio Town Hall was intended for use as a town hall and as a meeting place for all civic and political functions in the community.

See also

 List of cities and towns in Utah

References

External links

Towns in Millard County, Utah
Towns in Utah
Populated places established in 1859
1859 establishments in Utah Territory
Great Basin National Heritage Area